Tyler Stone (born September 8, 1991) is an American professional basketball player for Rapid București of the Liga Națională. He played college basketball for the University of Missouri and Southeast Missouri State University before playing professionally in Turkey, Greece, Japan, Israel, Russia and Italy.

High school career
Stone attended Central High School in Memphis, Tennessee. As a senior, he averaged 15 points and eight rebounds, leading the Warriors to a 25-4 record, and earning All-Area, All-Region and District 16 AAA Most Valuable Player honors. He also earned All-Metro honors as a junior and a senior.

College career
In his freshman season at Missouri, Stone played sparingly for the Tigers. In 12 games, he averaged just 1.8 points per game.

In April 2010, he transferred to Southeast Missouri State and subsequently sat out the 2010–11 season due to NCAA transfer rules.

In his sophomore season, he was named to the All-OVC second team, OVC All-Newcomer team and NABC All-District first team. In 31 games (29 starts), he averaged 14.7 points, 7.3 rebounds and 1.1 blocks in 29.6 minutes per game.

In his junior season, he was named to the All-OVC second team for the second straight year. In 33 games (29 starts), he averaged 15.5 points, 7.8 rebounds, 1.2 assists and 1.3 blocks in 32.2 minutes per game.

In his senior season, he was named to the All-OVC first team, and became the 23rd player at Southeast to score over 1,000 points in his career when he finished with 24 at Ball State on November 18, 2013. In 30 games (26 starts), he averaged 19.3 points, 9.5 rebounds, 1.9 assists, 1.0 steals and 1.5 blocks in 33.5 minutes per game.

Professional career

2014–15 season
After going undrafted in the 2014 NBA draft, Stone joined the Indiana Pacers for the 2014 NBA Summer League. On July 9, 2014, he signed with Beşiktaş for the 2014–15 Turkish Basketball League season. However, on October 11, he was loaned to Denizli Basket of the Turkish Second League before appearing in a game for them. In 28 games for Denizli, he averaged 14.5 points, 7.6 rebounds, 1.3 assists and 1.3 steals per game.

2015–16 season
In July 2015, Stone joined the Minnesota Timberwolves for the 2015 NBA Summer League. On October 29, 2015 he signed with Rethymno Cretan Kings of the Greek Basketball League.

2016–17 season
On August 5, 2016, Stone signed a one-year deal with the Japanese team Chiba Jets. In 57 games played during the 2016–17 season, he averaged 17.9 points, 7.1 rebounds and 2.2 assists per game.

2017–18 season
On August 16, 2017, Stone signed with the Israeli team Hapoel Gilboa Galil for the 2017–18 season. On November 6, 2017, Stone recorded a career-high 36 points, shooting 14-of-21 from the field, along with eleven rebounds in a 92–73 win over Ironi Nahariya. He was subsequently named Israeli League Round 5 MVP. In 7 games played for Gilboa Galil, he averaged 20.2 points, 9.4 rebounds and 3.4 assists per game.

On November 21, 2017, His contract was bought out by the Shimane Susanoo Magic of the top-tier Japanese B.League.

2018–19 season
On July 24, 2018, Stone joined the Russian team Enisey of the VTB United League. On February 27, 2019, Stone signed with the Italian team Pallacanestro Cantù for the rest of the season.

2019–20 season
On July 31, 2019, he has signed with New Basket Brindisi of the Italian Lega Basket Serie A (LBA).  He averaged 14.8 points and 7.1 rebounds per game.

2020–21 season
On July 12, 2020, Stone signed with Nanterre 92 of the French LNB Pro A. He averaged 10 points and 4.8 rebounds per game.

2020–21 season
On August 13, 2021, Stone signed with JL Bourg. He parted ways with the team on September 27.

2021–22 season
On September 27, 2021, Stone signed with BCM Gravelines-Dunkerque of the LNB Pro A.

2022–23 season
On August 6, 2022, he has signed with Rapid București of the Liga Națională.

Personal
Stone is the son of James Bradley and Sharon Stone. His father played collegiately at the University of Memphis and was drafted 35th overall by the Atlanta Hawks in 1979. His cousin, Jarekious Bradley, joined him at Southeast Missouri State in 2013.Spouse: Brittney McCollins-Stone
Children: Bailey Stone, Tyler Stone Jr.

References

External links
Southeast Missouri State bio
RealGM.com profile
DraftExpress.com Profile

1991 births
Living people
American expatriate basketball people in France
American expatriate basketball people in Greece
American expatriate basketball people in Israel
American expatriate basketball people in Italy
American expatriate basketball people in Japan
American expatriate basketball people in Russia
American expatriate basketball people in Turkey
American men's basketball players
Basketball players from Memphis, Tennessee
BC Enisey players
BCM Gravelines players
Chiba Jets Funabashi players
Hapoel Gilboa Galil Elyon players
Lega Basket Serie A players
Missouri Tigers men's basketball players
Nanterre 92 players
New Basket Brindisi players
Pallacanestro Cantù players
Power forwards (basketball)
Rethymno B.C. players
Shimane Susanoo Magic players
Southeast Missouri State Redhawks men's basketball players